The 2018 Florida Gators baseball team represented the University of Florida in the sport of baseball during the 2018 college baseball season.  The Gators competed in the Eastern Division of the Southeastern Conference (SEC).  They played their home games at Alfred A. McKethan Stadium on the university's Gainesville, Florida campus.  The team was coached by Kevin O'Sullivan in his eleventh season as Florida head coach.  The Gators entered the season as the defending national champions, having defeated LSU two games to none in the championship series of the 2017 College World Series.

Roster

By player

By position

Coaching staff

Schedule

! style="background:#FF4A00;color:white;"| Regular Season
|- valign="top" 

|- bgcolor="#ddffdd"
| February 16 ||  || No. 1 || McKethan Stadium Gainesville, FL || 7–1 || Singer (1–0) || White (0–1) || None || 5,270 || 1–0 || –
|- bgcolor="#ddffdd"
| February 17 || Siena || No. 1 || McKethan Stadium || 10–2 || Kowar (1–0) || Miller (0–1) || None || 4,306 || 2–0 || –
|- bgcolor="#ddffdd"
| February 18 || Siena || No. 1 || McKethan Stadium || 19–2 || Dyson (1–0) || Nolan (0–1) || None || 3,955 || 3–0 || –
|- bgcolor="#ddffdd"
| February 20 ||  || No. 1 || McKethan Stadium || 6–1 || Leftwich (1–0) || Prather (0–1) || None || 2,944 || 4–0 || –
|- bgcolor="#ddffdd"
| February 21 ||  || No. 1 || McKethan Stadium || 7–4 || Long (1–0) || Krull (0–1) || Byrne (1) || 3,249 || 5–0 || –
|- bgcolor="#ddffdd"
| February 23 || at No. 24 Miami (FL)Rivalry || No. 1 || Alex Rodriguez ParkCoral Gables, FL || 7–3 || Singer (2–0) || Bargfeldt (1–1) || Mace (1) || 3,596 || 6–0 || –
|- bgcolor="#ddffdd"
| February 24 || at No. 24 Miami (FL)Rivalry || No. 1 || Alex Rodriguez Park || 8–2 || Kowar (2–0) || Veliz (0–1) || Leftwich (1) || 4,156 || 7–0 || –
|- bgcolor="#ffdddd"
| February 25 || at No. 24 Miami (FL)Rivalry || No. 1 || Alex Rodriguez Park || 0–2 || McKendry (1–1) || Dyson (1–1) || Cabezas (2) || 3,388 || 7–1 || –
|- bgcolor="#ddffdd"
| February 27 || at  || No. 1 || Harmon StadiumJacksonville, FL || 4–0 || Butler (1–0) || German (0–1) || None || 1,671 || 8–1 || –
|- bgcolor="#ddffdd"
| February 28 || North Florida || No. 1 || McKethan Stadium || 8–3 || Baker (1–0) || Norkus (2–1) || None || 3,338 || 9–1 || –
|-

|- bgcolor="#ddffdd"
| March 2 ||  || No. 1 || McKethan Stadium || 12–5 || Singer (3–0) || Creighton (1–1) || Byrne (2) || 3,366 || 10–1 || –
|- bgcolor="#ddffdd"
| March 3 || Stony Brook || No. 1 || McKethan Stadium || 8–0 || Kowar (3–0) || Clarke (1–1) || None || 3,925 || 11–1 || –
|- bgcolor="#ddffdd"
| March 4 || Stony Brook || No. 1 || McKethan Stadium || 3–1 || Dyson (2–1) ||  || Byrne (3) || 3,675 || 12–1 || –
|- bgcolor="#ffdddd"
| March 6 || at UCF || No. 1 || John Euliano ParkOrlando, FL || 7–9 ||  || Leftwich (1–1) || Westberg (1) || 4,016 || 12–2 || –
|- bgcolor="#ffdddd"
| March 7 || UCF || No. 1 || McKethan Stadium || 2–4 || Sheridan (2–0) || Butler (1–1) || Westberg (2) || 3,253 || 12–3 || –
|- bgcolor="#ddffdd"
| March 9 ||  || No. 1 || McKethan Stadium || 9–0 || Singer (4–0) || Wilson (0–3) || None || 3,075 || 13–3 || –
|- bgcolor="#ddffdd"
| March 10 (1) || Rhode Island || No. 1 || McKethan Stadium || 9–2 || Dyson (3–1) || Jangols (1–2) || None || 3,121 || 14–3 || –
|- bgcolor="#ddffdd"
|  || Rhode Island || No. 1 || McKethan Stadium || 3–2 || Leftwich (2–1) || Johnson (0–2) || None || 3,446 || 15–3 || –
|- bgcolor="#ddffdd"
| March 13 || No. 7 Rivalry || No. 2 || McKethan Stadium || 12–6 || Mace (1–0) || Karp (3–1) || None || 6,042 || 16–3 || –
|- bgcolor="#ddffdd"
| March 16 || at South Carolina || No. 2 || Founders ParkColumbia, SC || 7–3 || Singer (5–0) || Hill (2–2) || Byrne (4) || 7,034 || 17–3 || 1–0
|- bgcolor="#ffdddd"
| March 17 || at South Carolina || No. 2 || Founders Park || 7–15 || Morris (4–1) || Kowar (3–1) || None || 7,207 || 17–4 || 1–1
|- bgcolor="#ddffdd"
| March 18 || at South Carolina || No. 2 || Founders Park || 3–2 || Dyson (4–1) || Chapman (1–2) || Byrne (5) || 7,113 || 18–4 || 2–1
|- bgcolor="#bbbbbb"
| March 20 ||  || No. 2 || McKethan Stadium || colspan=7| Postponed (rain) Makeup: March 21 
|- bgcolor="#ddffdd"
| March 21 || Jacksonville || No. 2 || McKethan Stadium || 10–3 || Baker (2–0) || Stockton (1–3) || None || 3,201 || 19–4 || –
|- bgcolor="#ffdddd"
| March 23 || No. 4 Arkansas || No. 2 || McKethan Stadium || 3–6 || Knight (4–0) || Singer (5–1) || Cronin (4) || 5,025 || 19–5 || 2–2
|- bgcolor="#ddffdd"
| March 24 || No. 4 Arkansas || No. 2 || McKethan Stadium || 17–2 || Kowar (4–1) || Campbell (2–3) || None || 4,815 || 20–5 || 3–2
|- bgcolor="#ddffdd"
| March 25 || No. 4 Arkansas || No. 2 || McKethan Stadium || 5–4 || Byrne (1–0) || Murphy (3–1) || None || 4,510 || 21–5 || 4–2
|- bgcolor="#ddffdd"
| March 27 || Rivalry || No. 2 || Baseball GroundsJacksonville, FL || 1–0 || Leftwich (3–1) || Karp (4–2) || Byrne (6) || 9,613 || 22–5 || –
|- bgcolor="#ddffdd"
| March 30 || No. 8  || No. 2 || McKethan Stadium || 8–4 || Singer (6–1) || Fellows (4–1) || Byrne (7) || 3,781 || 23–5 || 5–2
|- bgcolor="#ddffdd"
| March 31 || No. 8 Vanderbilt || No. 2 || McKethan Stadium || 10–2 || Kowar (5–1) || Raby (2–4) || None || 4,835 || 24–5 || 6–2
|-
| colspan=11 | Rescheduled from March 11 due to the threat of rain.
|- 

|- bgcolor="#ddffdd"
| April 1 || No. 8 Vanderbilt || No. 2 || McKethan Stadium || 8–2 || Butler (2–1) || Hickman (5–1) ||  || 3,736 || 25–5 || 7–2
|- bgcolor="#ddffdd"
| April 3 ||  || No. 1 || McKethan Stadium || 8–4 || Mace (2–0) || Lumbert (4–1) || None || 3,493 || 26–5 || –
|- bgcolor="#bbbbbb"
| April 6 || at Tennessee || No. 1 || Knoxville, TN || colspan=7| Postponed (rain) Makeup: April 8 as a single-admission, 7-inning doubleheader 
|- bgcolor="#ddffdd"
| April 7 || at Tennessee || No. 1 || Lindsey Nelson Stadium || 22–6 || Singer (7–1) || Crochet (2–4) || None || 1,819 || 27–5 || 8–2
|- bgcolor="#ddffdd"
| April 8 (1) || at Tennessee || No. 1 || Lindsey Nelson Stadium || 6–411 || Butler (3–1) || Lingenfelter (2–3) || None || 2,639 || 28–5 || 9–2
|- bgcolor="#ffdddd"
| April 8 (2) || at Tennessee || No. 1 || Lindsey Nelson Stadium || 4–67 || Neely (4–1) || Dyson (4–2) || None || 2,639 || 28–6 || 9–3
|- bgcolor="#ddffdd"
| April 10 || Rivalry || No. 1 || Dick Howser StadiumTallahassee, FL || 6–3 || Mace (3–0) || Karp (5–3) || Byrne (8) || 5,979 || 29–6 || –
|- bgcolor="#ddffdd"
| April 13 || Missouri || No. 1 || McKethan Stadium || 3–1 ||  || Sikkema (2–3) || Byrne (9) || 6,214 || 30–6 || 10–3
|- bgcolor="#ddffdd"
| April 14 (1) || Missouri || No. 1 || McKethan Stadium || 10–2 || Kowar (6–1) || LaPlante (4–2) || None || 5,820 || 31–6 || 11–3
|- bgcolor="#ddffdd"
|  || Missouri || No. 1 || McKethan Stadium || 7–2 || Dyson (5–2) || Plassmeyer (4–1) || Byrne (10) || 3,955 || 32–6 || 12–3
|- bgcolor="#ffdddd"
| April 17 || Jacksonville || No. 1 || McKethan Stadium || 4–8 || Meyer (1–0) ||  || None || 3,478 || 32–7 || –
|- bgcolor="#ddffdd"
| April 19 || at No. 9 Kentucky || No. 1 || Cliff Hagan StadiumLexington, KY || 11–2 || Singer (8–1) || Hazelwood (0–1) || None || 3,646 || 33–7 || 13–3
|- bgcolor="#ddffdd"
| April 20 || at No. 9 Kentucky || No. 1 || Cliff Hagan Stadium || 9–4 || Kowar (7–1) || Hjelle (5–3) || None || 4,174 || 34–7 || 14–3
|- bgcolor="#ffdddd"
| April 21 || at No. 9 Kentucky || No. 1 || Cliff Hagan Stadium || 2–3 || Lewis (7–2) || Dyson (5–3) ||  || 4,461 || 34–8 || 14–4
|- bgcolor="#ffdddd"
| April 24 ||  || No. 1 || McKethan Stadium || 4–6 || Broom (8–1) || Churchill (0–1) || None || 3,133 || 34–9 || –
|- bgcolor="#ddffdd"
| April 26 || No. 22  || No. 1 || McKethan Stadium || 3–1 || Singer (9–1) || Mize (8–2) || Byrne (11) || 3,931 || 35–9 || 15–4
|- bgcolor="#ffdddd"
| April 27 || No. 22 Auburn || No. 1 || McKethan Stadium || 5–11 ||  || Kowar (7–2) || None || 4,404 || 35–10 || 15–5
|- bgcolor="#ddffdd"
| April 28 || No. 22 Auburn || No. 1 || McKethan Stadium || 12–3 || Leftwich (4–1) || Mitchell (0–1) || None || 4,018 || 36–10 || 16–5
|-
| colspan=11 | Rescheduled from April 15 due to the threat of rain.
|- 

|- bgcolor="#ddffdd"
| May 4 || at No. 18  || No. 1 || Olsen FieldCollege Station, TX || 9–0 || Singer (10–1) || Kilkenny (8–2) || None || 5,012 || 37–10 || 17–5
|- bgcolor="#ddffdd"
| May 5 || at No. 18 Texas A&M || No. 1 || Olsen Field || 6–1 || Kowar (8–2) || Doxakis (6–3) || None || 6,789 || 38–10 || 18–5
|- bgcolor="#ffdddd"
| May 6 || at No. 18 Texas A&M || No. 1 || Olsen Field || 3–7 || Kolek (5–4) || Leftwich (4–2) || Hoffman (10) || 5,259 || 38–11 || 18–6 
|- bgcolor="#ddffdd"
| May 8 ||  || No. 1 || McKethan Stadium || 11–8 || Butler (5–1) || King (4–2) || Byrne (12) || 3,484 || 39–11 || –
|- bgcolor="#ddffdd"
| May 11 || No. 15  || No. 1 || McKethan Stadium || 7–6 || Byrne (2–0) || Kristofak (3–2) || None || 5,279 || 40–11 || 19–6
|- bgcolor="#ddffdd"
| May 12 || No. 15 Georgia || No. 1 || McKethan Stadium || 9–3 || Kowar (9–2) || Hancock (6–4) || None || 4,621 || 41–11 || 20–6
|- bgcolor="#ffdddd"
| May 13 || No. 15 Georgia || No. 1 || McKethan Stadium || 1–4 || Smith (7–1) || Leftwich (4–3) || Schunk (8) || 4,135 || 41–12 || 20–7
|- bgcolor="#ffdddd"
| May 17 || at Mississippi State || No. 1 || Dudy Noble FieldStarkville, MS || 3–6 || Self (3–0) || Byrne (2–1) || None || 5,100 || 41–13 || 20–8
|- bgcolor="#ffdddd"
| May 18 || at Mississippi State || No. 1 || Dudy Noble Field || 4–12 || France (4–3) || Leftwich (4–4) || None || 5,901 || 41–14 || 20–9
|- bgcolor="#ffdddd"
| May 19 || at Mississippi State || No. 1 || Dudy Noble Field || 6–13 || Smith (4–0) || Kowar (9–3) || Gordon (3) || 6,291 || 41–15 || 20–10
|-

|-
! style="background:#FF4A00;color:white;"| Postseason
|-

|-
|- bgcolor="#ddffdd"
| May 23 || vs. (8) LSU ||  ||  Hoover, AL || 4–3 || Mace (4–0) || Hilliard (9–5) || Byrne (13) || 6,710 || 42–15 || 1–0
|- bgcolor="#bbbbbb"
| May 24 ||  || No. 3 (1) || Metropolitan Stadium || colspan=7| Postponed (rain) Makeup: May 25
|- bgcolor="#ffdddd"
| May 25 (1) || vs. No. 7 (4) Arkansas || No. 3 (1) || Metropolitan Stadium || 2–8 || Knight (10–0) || Kowar (9–4) || Cronin (11) || 1,384 || 42–16 || 1–1
|- bgcolor="#ffdddd"
|  || vs. (8) LSU || No. 3 (1) || Metropolitan Stadium || 0–117 || Beck (3–1) || Leftwich (4–5) || None || 8,945 || 42–17 || 1–2
|-
| colspan=11 | 
|-

|-
|- bgcolor="#ddffdd"
| June 1 || (4)  ||  ||  || 13–5 || Butler (6–1) || Wiest (2–5) || None || 2,823 || 43–17 || 1–0
|- bgcolor="#ddffdd"
| June 2 || (2) Jacksonville || No. 1 (1) ||  || 3–2 || Singer (11–1) ||  ||  || 3,874 || 44–17 || 2–0
|- bgcolor="#bbbbbb"
| June 3 ||  || No. 1 (1) ||  || colspan=7| Postponed (rain) Makeup: June 4
|- bgcolor="#ffdddd"
| June 4 (1) || (3) Florida Atlantic || No. 1 (1) ||  || 4–7 ||  || Kowar (9–5) || Peden (4) || 2,883 || 44–18 || 2–1
|- bgcolor="#ddffdd"
|  || (3) Florida Atlantic || No. 1 (1) ||  || 5–2 || Mace (5–0) || Poore (2–2) || Byrne (15) || 2,033 || 45–18 || 3–1
|-

|-
|- bgcolor="#ddffdd"
| June 9 || No. 19 Auburn ||  ||  || 8–2 || Singer (12–1) || Mize (10–6) || None || 4,610 || 46–18 || 1–0
|- bgcolor="#ffdddd"
| June 10 || No. 19 Auburn || No. 1 (1) || McKethan Stadium || 2–3 || Greenhill (6–2) || Butler (6–2) || None || 4,537 || 46–19 || 1–1
|- bgcolor="#ddffdd"
| June 11 || No. 19 Auburn || No. 1 (1) || McKethan Stadium || 3–211 || Byrne (3–1) || Greenhill (6–3) || None || 5,958 || 47–19 || 2–1
|-

|-
|- bgcolor="#ffdddd"
| June 17 ||  ||  || Omaha, NE || 3–6 || Shetter (6–0) || Singer (12–2) || None || 19,100 || 47–20 || 0–1
|- bgcolor="#ddffdd"
| June 19 || vs. No. 16 (13) Texas || No. 1 (1) || TD Ameritrade Park || 6–1 || Kowar (10–5) || Henley (6–7) || None || 16,620 || 48–20 || 1–1
|- bgcolor="#ddffdd"
| June 21 || vs. No. 11 (9) Texas Tech || No. 1 (1) || TD Ameritrade Park || 9–6 || Leftwich (5–5) || Kilian (9–3) || Byrne (16) || 24,806 || 49–20 || 2–1
|- bgcolor="#ffdddd"
| June 22 || vs. No. 6 (3) Arkansas || No. 1 (1) || TD Ameritrade Park || 2–5 || Campbell (5–6) || Singer (12–3) || Cronin (13) || 25,016 || 49–21 || 2–2
|-

Rankings from USA Today/ESPN Top 25 coaches' baseball poll. All times Eastern. Parentheses indicate tournament seedings. Retrieved from FloridaGators.com

Record vs. conference opponents

Rankings

References

Florida Gators
Florida Gators baseball seasons
Florida Gators baseball
Florida
College World Series seasons
Southeastern Conference baseball champion seasons